Al-Ahsa International Airport is an airport serving Hofuf (also known as Al-Ahsa or Al-Hasa), a city in Eastern Province, Saudi Arabia.

History
During Operation Desert Shield and the Gulf War in 1991, it served as an air base for the French Air Force.

GACA formally approved the airport's international status in 2011. The airport is expected to grow by 300,000 passengers per annum between 2015 and 2020, a GACA study predicted. Around 300,000 expatriate workers live in the area.

Airlines and destinations

See also 

 Transportation in Saudi Arabia
 Saudi Railways Organization
 Yanbu Airport

References

External links

 
 
 
 https://web.archive.org/web/20140116135927/http://www.alriyadh.com/net/article/901315

Airports in Saudi Arabia
Eastern Province, Saudi Arabia